Agyrta dichotoma is a moth of the subfamily Arctiinae. It was described by Max Wilhelm Karl Draudt in 1931. It is found in Colombia.

References

Moths described in 1931
Arctiinae of South America
Moths of South America